Dolova is a ghost village in Croatian municipality Dobrinj on the island of Krk.

Location 
The Dolovo is situated 2 km south of Dobrinj, and between the villages Kras and Gostinjac. Dolova is the easiest way to reach the road from Dobrinja to Kras.

There are ruins of several old, stone houses and once cultivated gardens, pastures and forests.

Population 
The population according to the 2011 census amounted to 0 people.

External links
 Official website of Dobrinj  
 Dolova - Informacije za ekologiju INECA

References 

Krk
Resorts in Croatia
Ghost towns in Croatia